The 2015 Canadian Direct Insurance BC Men's Curling Championship was held from February 3 to 8 at the Vernon Curling Club in Vernon, British Columbia. The winning Jim Cotter team represented British Columbia at the 2015 Tim Hortons Brier in Calgary.

Qualification process
Sixteen teams will qualify for the provincial tournament through several methods. The qualification process is as follows:

Teams
The teams are listed as follows:

Knockout Draw Brackets
The draw is listed as follows:

A Event

B Event

C Event

Playoffs

A vs. B
Saturday, February 7, 11:00 am

C1 vs. C2
Saturday, February 7, 11:00 am

Semifinal
Saturday, February 7, 7:00 pm

Final
Sunday, February 8, 12:30 pm

References

External links

Curling in British Columbia
2015 Tim Hortons Brier
Sport in Vernon, British Columbia
February 2015 sports events in Canada